

Events

Pre-1600
 919 – The nobles of Franconia and Saxony elect Henry the Fowler at the Imperial Diet in Fritzlar as king of the East Frankish Kingdom.
1218 – The Fifth Crusade leaves Acre for Egypt.
1276 – Magnus Ladulås is crowned King of Sweden in Uppsala Cathedral.
1487 – The ten-year-old Lambert Simnel is crowned in Christ Church Cathedral, Dublin, Ireland, with the name of Edward VI in a bid to threaten King Henry VII's reign.
1567 – Erik XIV of Sweden and his guards murder five incarcerated Swedish nobles.
1595 – Nomenclator of Leiden University Library appears, the first printed catalog of an institutional library.

1601–1900
1607 – One hundred-five English settlers under the leadership of Captain Christopher Newport established the colony called Jamestown at the mouth of the James River on the Virginia coast, the first permanent English colony in America. 
1621 – The Protestant Union is formally dissolved.
1626 – Peter Minuit buys Manhattan.
1667 – The French Royal Army crosses the border into the Spanish Netherlands, starting the War of Devolution opposing France to the Spanish Empire and the Triple Alliance.
1683 – The Ashmolean Museum in Oxford, England, opens as the world's first university museum.
1689 – The English Parliament passes the Act of Toleration protecting dissenting Protestants but excluding Roman Catholics.
1738 – John Wesley is converted, essentially launching the Methodist movement; the day is celebrated annually by Methodists as Aldersgate Day and a church service is generally held on the preceding Sunday.
1798 – The Irish Rebellion of 1798 led by the United Irishmen against British rule begins.
1813 – South American independence leader Simón Bolívar enters Mérida, leading the invasion of Venezuela, and is proclaimed El Libertador ("The Liberator").
1822 – Battle of Pichincha: Antonio José de Sucre secures the independence of the Presidency of Quito.
1832 – The First Kingdom of Greece is declared in the London Conference.
1844 – Samuel Morse sends the message "What hath God wrought" (a biblical quotation, Numbers 23:23) from a committee room in the United States Capitol to his assistant, Alfred Vail, in Baltimore, Maryland, to inaugurate a commercial telegraph line between Baltimore and Washington D.C. 
1856 – John Brown and his men kill five slavery supporters at Pottawatomie Creek, Kansas.
1861 – American Civil War: Union troops occupy Alexandria, Virginia.
1873 – Patrick Francis Healy becomes the first black president of a predominantly white university in the United States.
1883 – The Brooklyn Bridge in New York City is opened to traffic after 14 years of construction.
1900 – Second Boer War: The United Kingdom annexes the Orange Free State.

1901–present
1915 – World War I: Italy declares war on Austria-Hungary, joining the conflict on the side of the Allies.
1930 – Amy Johnson lands in Darwin, Northern Territory, becoming the first woman to fly solo from England to Australia (she left on May 5 for the 11,000 mile flight).
1935 – The first night game in Major League Baseball history is played in Cincinnati, Ohio, with the Cincinnati Reds beating the Philadelphia Phillies 2–1 at Crosley Field.
1940 – Igor Sikorsky performs the first successful single-rotor helicopter flight.
  1940   – Acting on the orders of Soviet leader Joseph Stalin, NKVD agent Iosif Grigulevich orchestrates an unsuccessful assassination attempt on exiled Russian revolutionary Leon Trotsky in Coyoacán, Mexico.
1941 – World War II: In the Battle of the Atlantic, the German Battleship Bismarck sinks then-pride of the Royal Navy, killing all but three crewmen.
1944 – Börse Berlin building burns down after being hit in an air raid during World War II.
1948 – Arab–Israeli War: Egypt captures the Israeli kibbutz of Yad Mordechai, but the five-day effort gives Israeli forces time to prepare enough to stop the Egyptian advance a week later.
1956 – The first Eurovision Song Contest is held in Lugano, Switzerland.
1958 – United Press International is formed through a merger of the United Press and the International News Service.
1960 – Following the 1960 Valdivia earthquake, the largest ever recorded earthquake, Cordón Caulle begins to erupt.
1961 – American civil rights movement: Freedom Riders are arrested in Jackson, Mississippi, for "disturbing the peace" after disembarking from their bus.
1962 – Project Mercury: American astronaut Scott Carpenter orbits the Earth three times in the Aurora 7 space capsule.
1967 – Egypt imposes a blockade and siege of the Red Sea coast of Israel.
  1967   – Belle de Jour, directed by Luis Buñuel, is released.
1976 – The Judgment of Paris takes place in France, launching California as a worldwide force in the production of quality wine.
1981 – Ecuadorian president Jaime Roldós Aguilera, his wife, and his presidential committee die in an aircraft accident while travelling from Quito to Zapotillo minutes after the president gave a famous speech regarding the 24 de mayo anniversary of the Battle of Pichincha.
1982 – Liberation of Khorramshahr: Iranians recapture of the port city of Khorramshahr from the Iraqis during the Iran–Iraq War.
1988 – Section 28 of the United Kingdom's Local Government Act 1988, a controversial amendment stating that a local authority cannot intentionally promote homosexuality, is enacted.
1991 – Israel conducts Operation Solomon, evacuating Ethiopian Jews to Israel.
1992 – The last Thai dictator, General Suchinda Kraprayoon, resigns following pro-democracy protests.
  1992   – The ethnic cleansing in Kozarac, Bosnia and Herzegovina begins when Serbian militia and police forces enter the town.
1993 – Eritrea gains its independence from Ethiopia.
  1993   – Roman Catholic Cardinal Juan Jesús Posadas Ocampo and five other people are assassinated in a shootout at Miguel Hidalgo y Costilla Guadalajara International Airport in Mexico.
1994 – Four men are convicted of bombing the World Trade Center in New York in 1993; each one is sentenced to 240 years in prison.
1995 – While attempting to return to Leeds Bradford Airport in the United Kingdom, Knight Air Flight 816 crashes in Harewood, North Yorkshire, killing all 12 people on board.
1999 – The International Criminal Tribunal for the former Yugoslavia in The Hague, Netherlands indicts Slobodan Milošević and four others for war crimes and crimes against humanity committed in Kosovo.
2000 – Israeli troops withdraw from southern Lebanon after 22 years of occupation.
2002 – Russia and the United States sign the Moscow Treaty.
2014 – A 6.4 magnitude earthquake occurs in the Aegean Sea between Greece and Turkey, injuring 324 people.
  2014   – At least three people are killed in a shooting at Brussels' Jewish Museum of Belgium.
2019 – Twenty-two students die in a fire in Surat (India).
  2019   – Under pressure over her handling of Brexit, British Prime Minister Theresa May announces her resignation as Leader of the Conservative Party, effective as of June 7.
2022 – A mass shooting occurs at Robb Elementary School in Uvalde, Texas, United States, resulting in the deaths of 21 people, including 19 children.

Births

Pre-1600
15 BC – Germanicus, Roman general (d. 19)
1335 – Margaret of Bohemia, Queen of Hungary (d. 1349)
1494 – Pontormo, Italian painter (d. 1557)
1522 – John Jewel, English bishop (d. 1571)
1544 – William Gilbert, English physician, physicist, and astronomer (d. 1603)
1576 – Elizabeth Carey, Lady Berkeley, English courtier (d. 1635)

1601–1900
1616 – John Maitland, 1st Duke of Lauderdale, Scottish politician, Secretary of State, Scotland (d. 1682)
1628 – Marek Sobieski, Polish noble (d. 1652)
1669 – Emerentia von Düben, Swedish royal favorite (d. 1743)
1671 – Gian Gastone de' Medici, Grand Duke of Tuscany (d. 1737)
1686 – Daniel Gabriel Fahrenheit, Polish-German physicist and engineer, developed the Fahrenheit scale (d. 1736)
1689 – Daniel Finch, 8th Earl of Winchilsea, English politician, Lord President of the Council (d. 1769)
1743 – Jean-Paul Marat, Swiss-French physician, journalist, and politician (d. 1793)
1789 – Cathinka Buchwieser, German operatic singer and actress (d.1828)
1794 – William Whewell, English priest and philosopher (d. 1866)
1803 – Alexander von Nordmann, Finnish biologist and paleontologist (d. 1866)
1810 – Abraham Geiger, German rabbi and scholar (d. 1874)
1816 – Emanuel Leutze, German-American painter (d. 1868)
1819 – Queen Victoria of the United Kingdom (d. 1901)
1830 – Alexei Savrasov, Russian painter and academic (d. 1897)
1855 – Arthur Wing Pinero, English actor, director, and playwright (d. 1934)
1861 – Gerald Strickland, 1st Baron Strickland, Maltese lawyer and politician, 4th Prime Minister of Malta (d. 1940)
1863 – George Grey Barnard, American sculptor (d. 1938)
1868 – Charlie Taylor, American engineer and mechanic (d. 1956)
1870 – Benjamin N. Cardozo, American lawyer and judge (d. 1938)
  1870   – Jan Smuts, South African lawyer and politician, 2nd Prime Minister of South Africa (d. 1950)
1874 – Princess Marie of Hesse and by Rhine (d. 1878)
1875 – Robert Garrett, American discus thrower and shot putter (d. 1961)
1878 – Lillian Moller Gilbreth, American psychologist and engineer (d. 1972)
1879 – H. B. Reese, American candy maker, created Reese's Peanut Butter Cups (d. 1956)
1886 – Paul Paray, French organist, composer, and conductor (d. 1979)
1887 – Mick Mannock, Irish soldier and pilot, Victoria Cross recipient (d. 1918)
1891 – William F. Albright, American archaeologist, philologist, and scholar (d. 1971)
1892 – Elizabeth Foreman Lewis, American author and educator (d. 1958)
1895 – Samuel Irving Newhouse Sr., American publisher, founded Advance Publications (d. 1979)
1899 – Suzanne Lenglen, French tennis player (d. 1938)
  1899   – Henri Michaux, Belgian-French poet and painter (d. 1984)
1900 – Eduardo De Filippo, Italian actor and screenwriter (d. 1984)

1901–present
1901 – José Nasazzi, Uruguayan footballer and manager (d. 1968)
1902 – Lionel Conacher, Canadian football player and politician (d. 1954)
  1902   – Sylvia Daoust, Canadian sculptor (d. 2004)
1904 – Chūhei Nambu, Japanese jumper and journalist (d. 1997)
1905 – George Nakashima, American woodworker and architect (d. 1990)
  1905   – Mikhail Sholokhov, Russian novelist and short story writer, Nobel Prize laureate (d. 1984)
1909 – Wilbur Mills, American banker and politician (d. 1992)
1910 – Jimmy Demaret, American golfer (d. 1983)
1913 – Joe Abreu, American baseball player and soldier (d. 1993)
1914 – Lilli Palmer, German-American actress (d. 1986)
1916 – Roden Cutler, Australian lieutenant and politician, 32nd Governor of New South Wales (d. 2002)
1917 – Alan Campbell, Baron Campbell of Alloway, English lawyer and judge (d. 2013)
1918 – Coleman Young, American politician, 66th Mayor of Detroit (d. 1997)
1923 – Siobhán McKenna, Irish actress (d. 1986)
1924 – Philip Pearlstein, American soldier and painter (d. 2022)
1925 – Carmine Infantino, American illustrator and educator (d. 2013)
  1925   – Mai Zetterling, Swedish actress and director (d. 1994)
1926 – Stanley Baxter, Scottish actor and screenwriter
1928 – William Trevor, Irish novelist, playwright and short story writer (d. 2016)
1932 – Arnold Wesker, English playwright and producer (d. 2016)
1933 – Jane Byrne, American lawyer and politician, 50th Mayor of Chicago (d. 2014)
  1933   – Réal Giguère, Canadian television host and actor (d. 2019)
  1933   – Aharon Lichtenstein, French-Israeli rabbi and author (d. 2015)
1935 – Joan Micklin Silver, American director and screenwriter (d. 2020)
1936 – Harold Budd, American composer and poet (d. 2020)
1937 – Maryvonne Dupureur, French runner and educator (d. 2008)
  1937   – Archie Shepp, American saxophonist and composer
1938 – Prince Buster, Jamaican singer-songwriter and producer (d. 2016)
  1938   – Tommy Chong, Canadian-American actor, director, producer, and screenwriter
1940 – Joseph Brodsky, Russian-American poet and essayist, Nobel Prize laureate (d. 1996)
1941 – Bob Dylan, American singer-songwriter, guitarist, artist, writer, and producer; Nobel Prize laureate
  1941   – Patricia Hollis, Baroness Hollis of Heigham, English academic and politician
1942 – Ali Bacher, South African cricketer and manager
  1942   – Hannu Mikkola, Finnish race car driver (d. 2021)
  1942   – Ichirō Ozawa, Japanese lawyer and politician, Japanese Minister of Home Affairs
1943 – Gary Burghoff, American actor
1944 – Patti LaBelle, American singer-songwriter and actress
  1944   – Dominique Lavanant, French actress
1945 – Terry Callier, American singer-songwriter and guitarist (d. 2012)
  1945   – Steven Norris, English engineer and politician
  1945   – Richard Ottaway, English lieutenant and politician, Shadow Secretary of State for Environment, Food and Rural Affairs
  1945   – Priscilla Presley, American actress and businesswoman
1946 – Tansu Çiller, Turkish politician, Prime Minister of Turkey
  1946   – Jesualdo Ferreira, Portuguese footballer and manager
  1946   – Irena Szewińska, Russian-Polish sprinter (d. 2018)
1947 – Albert Bouchard, American singer-songwriter, guitarist, and drummer
  1947   – Mike De Leon, Filipino director, producer, screenwriter and cinematographer
  1947   – Mike Reid, American singer-songwriter, pianist, and American football player
  1947   – Waddy Wachtel, American guitarist, singer-songwriter, and record producer
  1947   – Martin Winterkorn, German businessman
1948 – Richard Dembo, French director and screenwriter (d. 2004)
1949 – Jim Broadbent, English actor
  1949   – Roger Deakins, English cinematographer
1953 – Alfred Molina, English actor
1955 – Rosanne Cash, American singer-songwriter and guitarist
  1955   – Philippe Lafontaine, Belgian singer and songwriter
  1955   – Rajesh Roshan, Indian composer
1956 – R. B. Bernstein, American constitutional historian
  1956   – Larry Blackmon, American singer-songwriter and producer
  1956   – Dominic Grieve, English lawyer and politician, Attorney General for England and Wales
  1956   – Michael Jackson, Irish archbishop
1958 – Chip Ganassi, American race car driver, team owner and businessman
1959 – Pelle Lindbergh, Swedish-American ice hockey player (d. 1985)
  1959   – Barry O'Farrell, Australian politician, 43rd Premier of New South Wales
1960 – Guy Fletcher, English keyboard player, guitarist, and producer
  1960   – Bill Harrigan, Australian rugby league referee and sportscaster
  1960   – Kristin Scott Thomas, English actress
1961 – Lorella Cedroni, Italian philosopher and theorist (d. 2013)
  1961   – Alain Lemieux, Canadian-American ice hockey player and coach
1962 – Héctor Camacho, Puerto Rican-American boxer (d. 2012)
  1962   – Gene Anthony Ray, American actor, dancer, and choreographer (d. 2003)
1963 – Ivan Capelli, Italian race car driver and sportscaster
  1963   – Michael Chabon, American novelist, short story writer, and screenwriter
  1963   – Joe Dumars, American basketball player
  1963   – Rich Rodriguez, American football player and coach
  1963   – Valerie Taylor, American computer scientist and educator
1964 – Liz McColgan, Scottish educator and runner
  1964   – Adrian Moorhouse, English swimmer
  1964   – Isidro Pérez, Mexican boxer (d. 2013)
  1964   – Pat Verbeek, Canadian ice hockey player and manager
1965 – John C. Reilly, American actor
  1965   – Shinichirō Watanabe, Japanese director, producer, and screenwriter
1966 – Éric Cantona, French footballer, manager, and actor
  1966   – Ricky Craven, American race car driver and sportscaster
1967 – Tamer Karadağlı, Turkish actor
  1967   – Andrey Borodin, Russian-English economist and businessman
  1967   – Eric Close, American actor
  1967   – Heavy D, Jamaican-American rapper, producer, and actor (d. 2011)
  1967   – Carlos Hernández, Venezuelan-American baseball player and manager
1969 – Martin McCague, Northern Irish-English cricketer
  1969   – Jacob Rees-Mogg, English politician
  1969   – Rich Robinson, American guitarist and songwriter
  1969   – Mandar Agashe, Indian music director and businessman
1971 – Kris Draper, Canadian ice hockey player and manager
1972 – Greg Berlanti, American director, producer, and screenwriter
1973 – Rodrigo, Argentinian singer-songwriter (d. 2000)
  1973   – Bartolo Colón, Dominican-American baseball player
  1973   – Shirish Kunder, Indian director, producer, and screenwriter
  1973   – Vladimír Šmicer, Czech footballer and manager
1974 – Sébastien Foucan, French runner and actor
  1974   – Masahide Kobayashi, Japanese baseball player and coach
  1974   – Magnus Manske, German biochemist and computer programmer, developed MediaWiki
1975 – Will Sasso, Canadian actor and comedian 
  1975   – Marc Gagnon, Canadian speed skater
  1975   – Giannis Goumas, Greek footballer and coach
  1975   – Maria Lawson, English singer-songwriter
1976 – Alessandro Cortini, Italian-American singer and keyboard player
  1976   – Catherine Cox, New Zealand-Australian netball player
  1976   – Silje Vige, Norwegian singer
1977 – Jeet Gannguli, Indian score composer, music director and singer
1978 – Elijah Burke, American wrestler
  1978   – Johan Holmqvist, Swedish ice hockey player
  1978   – Brad Penny, American baseball player
  1978   – Rose, French singer, songwriter and composer
1979 – Tracy McGrady, American basketball player
  1979   – Kareem McKenzie, American football player
1980 – Jason Babin, American football player
  1980   – Anthony Minichiello, Australian rugby league player
1981 – Andy Lee, Australian comedian, actor, and screenwriter
1982 – Issah Gabriel Ahmed, Ghanaian footballer
  1982   – Rian Wallace, American football player
1983 – Custódio Castro, Portuguese footballer
  1983   – Pedram Javaheri, Iranian-American meteorologist and journalist
  1983   – Woo Seung-yeon, South Korean model and actress (d. 2009)
1984 – Sarah Hagan, American actress
  1984   – Dmitri Kruglov, Estonian footballer
  1984   – Masaya Takahashi, Japanese wrestler
1985 – Tim Bridgman, English race car driver
1986 – Mark Ballas, American singer-songwriter, guitarist, dancer, and actor
  1986   – Giannis Kontoes, Greek footballer
1987 – Guillaume Latendresse, Canadian ice hockey player
1988 – Artem Anisimov, Russian ice hockey player
  1988   – Monica Lin Brown, American sergeant
  1988   – Billy Gilman, American musician
  1988   – Lucian Wintrich, American political artist and White House correspondent
1989 – G-Eazy, American rapper
  1989   – Andrew Jordan, English race car driver
  1989   – Kalin Lucas, American basketball player
1990 – Mattias Ekholm, Swedish ice hockey player
1991 – Aled Davies, Welsh discus thrower
  1991   – Cody Eakin, Canadian ice hockey player
1992 – Marcus Bettinelli, English footballer
1994 – Jarell Martin, American basketball player
  1994   – Emily Nicholl, Scottish netball player
  1994   – Daiya Seto, Japanese swimmer
  1994   – Emily Temple Wood, American  2016 Wikipedian of the Year award
1999 – Tarjei Sandvik Moe, Norwegian actor

Deaths

Pre-1600
 688 – Ségéne, bishop of Armagh (b. c. 610)
1089 – Lanfranc, Archbishop of Canterbury
1136 – Hugues de Payens, first Grand Master of the Knights Templar (b. c. 1070)
1153 – David I of Scotland (b. 1083)
1201 – Theobald III, Count of Champagne (b. 1179)
1351 – Abu al-Hasan Ali ibn Othman, Moroccan sultan (b. 1297)
1408 – Taejo of Joseon  (b. 1335)
1425 – Murdoch Stewart, 2nd Duke of Albany, Scottish politician (b. 1362)
1456 – Ambroise de Loré, French commander (b. 1396)
1543 – Nicolaus Copernicus, Polish mathematician and astronomer (b. 1473)

1601–1900
1612 – Robert Cecil, 1st Earl of Salisbury, English politician, Lord High Treasurer (b. 1563)
1627 – Luis de Góngora, Spanish poet and cleric (b. 1561)
1632 – Robert Hues, English mathematician and geographer (b. 1553)
1665 – Mary of Jesus of Ágreda, Spanish Franciscan abbess and mystic (b. 1602)
1734 – Georg Ernst Stahl, German physician and chemist (b. 1660)
1792 – George Brydges Rodney, 1st Baron Rodney, English admiral and politician, 16th Governor of Newfoundland (b. 1718)
1806 – John Campbell, 5th Duke of Argyll, Scottish field marshal and politician, Lord Lieutenant of Argyllshire (b. 1723)
1843 – Sylvestre François Lacroix, French mathematician and academic (b. 1765)
1848 – Annette von Droste-Hülshoff, German author and composer (b. 1797)
1861 – Elmer E. Ellsworth, American colonel (b. 1837)
1872 – Julius Schnorr von Carolsfeld, German painter and illustrator (b. 1794)
1879 – William Lloyd Garrison, American journalist and activist (b. 1805)
1881 – Samuel Palmer, English painter and illustrator (b. 1805)

1901–present
1901 – Louis-Zéphirin Moreau, Canadian bishop (b. 1824)
1908 – Old Tom Morris, Scottish golfer and architect (b. 1821)
1915 – John Condon, Irish-English soldier (b. 1896)
1919 – Amado Nervo, Mexican poet, journalist, and educator (b. 1870)
1929 – Nikolai von Meck, Russian engineer (b. 1863)
1939 – Fanny Searls, American biologist (b. 1851)
1941 – Lancelot Holland, English admiral (b. 1887)
1945 – Robert Ritter von Greim, German field marshal and pilot (b. 1892)
1948 – Jacques Feyder, Belgian actor, director, and screenwriter (b. 1885)
1949 – Alexey Shchusev, Russian architect, designed Lenin's Mausoleum and Moscow Kazanskaya railway station (b. 1873)
1950 – Archibald Wavell, 1st Earl Wavell, English field marshal and politician, 43rd Governor-General of India (b. 1883)
1951 – Thomas N. Heffron, American actor, director, screenwriter (b. 1872)
1956 – Martha Annie Whiteley, English chemist and mathematician (b. 1866)
1958 – Frank Rowe, Australian public servant (b. 1895)
1959 – John Foster Dulles, American soldier, lawyer, and politician, 52nd United States Secretary of State (b. 1888)
1963 – Elmore James, American singer-songwriter and guitarist (b. 1918)
1965 – Sonny Boy Williamson II, American singer-songwriter and harmonica player (b. 1908)
1974 – Duke Ellington, American pianist and composer (b. 1899)
1976 – Denise Pelletier, Canadian actress (b. 1923)
1979 – Ernest Bullock, English organist, composer, and educator (b. 1890)
1981 – Herbert Müller, Swiss race car driver (b. 1940)
1984 – Vince McMahon Sr., American wrestling promoter and businessman, founded WWE (b. 1914)
1988 – Freddie Frith, English motorcycle road racer (b. 1909)
1990 – Arthur Villeneuve, Canadian painter (b. 1910)
1991 – Gene Clark, American singer-songwriter and guitarist  (b. 1944)
1992 – Hitoshi Ogawa, Japanese race car driver (b. 1956)
1995 – Harold Wilson, English academic and politician, Prime Minister of the United Kingdom (b. 1916)
1996 – Enrique Álvarez Félix, Mexican actor (b. 1934)
  1996   – Joseph Mitchell, American journalist and author (b. 1908)
1997 – Edward Mulhare, Irish actor (b. 1923)
2000 – Kurt Schork, American journalist and scholar (b. 1947)
  2000   – Majrooh Sultanpuri, Indian poet and songwriter (b. 1919)
2002 – Wallace Markfield, American author (b. 1926)
2003 – Rachel Kempson, English actress (b. 1910)
2004 – Henry Ries, German-American photographer (b. 1917)
  2004   – Milton Shulman, Canadian author and critic (b. 1913)
  2004   – Edward Wagenknecht, American critic and educator (b. 1900)
2005 – Carl Amery, German activist and author (b. 1922)
  2005   – Arthur Haulot, Belgian journalist and poet (b. 1913)
  2005   – Guy Tardif, Canadian academic and politician (b. 1935)
2006 – Henry Bumstead, American art director and production designer (b. 1915)
  2006   – Claude Piéplu, French actor (b. 1923)
  2006   – Michał Życzkowski, Polish technician and educator (b. 1930)
2008 – Dick Martin, American actor, comedian, and director (b. 1922)
  2008   – Jimmy McGriff, American organist and bandleader (b. 1936)
2009 – Jay Bennett, American singer-songwriter, guitarist, and producer (b. 1963)
2010 – Ray Alan, English ventriloquist, actor, and screenwriter (b. 1930)
  2010   – Paul Gray, American bass player and songwriter (b. 1972)
  2010   – Raymond V. Haysbert, American businessman and activist (b. 1920)
  2010   – Petr Muk, Czech singer-songwriter and guitarist (b. 1965)
  2010   – Anneliese Rothenberger, German soprano and actress (b. 1926)
2011 – Huguette Clark, American heiress, painter, and philanthropist (b. 1906)
  2011   – Hakim Ali Zardari, Indian-Pakistani businessman and politician (b. 1930)
2012 – Klaas Carel Faber, Dutch-German SS officer (b. 1922)
  2012   – Kathi Kamen Goldmark, American journalist and author (b. 1948)
  2012   – Jacqueline Harpman, Belgian psychoanalyst and author (b. 1929)
  2012   – Juan Francisco Lombardo, Argentinian footballer (b. 1925)
  2012   – Lee Rich, American production manager and producer (b. 1918)
2013 – Helmut Braunlich, German-American violinist and composer (b. 1929)
  2013   – Ron Davies, Welsh footballer (b. 1942)
  2013   – Gotthard Graubner, German painter (b. 1930)
  2013   – Haynes Johnson, American journalist and author (b. 1931)
  2013   – Pyotr Todorovsky, Ukrainian-Russian director and screenwriter (b. 1925)
2014 – David Allen, English cricketer (b. 1935)
  2014   – Stormé DeLarverie, known as the "Rosa Parks of the lesbian community" (b. 1920)
  2014   – Mahafarid Amir Khosravi, Iranian businessman (b. 1969)
  2014   – Knowlton Nash, Canadian journalist and author (b. 1927)
  2014   – John Vasconcellos, American lieutenant, lawyer, and politician (b. 1932)
2015 – Dean Carroll, English rugby player (b. 1962)
  2015   – Kenneth Jacobs, Australian lawyer and judge (b. 1917)
  2015   – Tanith Lee, English author (b. 1947)
2018 – Gudrun Burwitz, daughter of Margarete Himmler and Heinrich Himmler (b. 1929)
  2018   – John Bain (TotalBiscuit), English gaming commentator and critic (b. 1984)

Holidays and observances
 Aldersgate Day/Wesley Day (Methodism)
 Battle of Pichincha Day (Ecuador)
 Bermuda Day (Bermuda), celebrated on the nearest weekday if May 24 falls on the weekend.
 Christian feast day:
 Anna Pak Agi (one of The Korean Martyrs)
 Donatian and Rogatian
 Jackson Kemper (Episcopal Church)
 Joanna
 Mary, Help of Christians
 Sarah (celebrated by the Romani people of Camargue)
 Vincent of Lérins
 May 24 (Eastern Orthodox liturgics)
 Commonwealth Day (Belize)
 Independence Day (Eritrea), celebrates the independence of Eritrea from Ethiopia in 1993.
 Lubiri Memorial Day (Buganda)
 Saints Cyril and Methodius Day (Eastern Orthodox Church, Julian Calendar) and its related observance:
 Bulgarian Education and Culture and Slavonic Literature Day (Bulgaria)
 Saints Cyril and Methodius, Slavonic Enlighteners' Day (North Macedonia)
 Victoria Day; celebrated on Monday on or before May 24. (Canada), and its related observance:
 National Patriots' Day or Journée nationale des patriotes (Quebec)

References

External links

 BBC: On This Day
 
 Historical Events on May 24

Days of the year
May